The  University of Tartu basketball team past rosters are for the rosters of University of Tartu basketball team, a professional basketball team based in Tartu, Estonia.

Note: The following page shows rosters players who have reached the Final Four of an international cup or championship.

1948/49

Titles

 Soviet Union Champion
 Estonian SSR Champion

Roster

1949/50

Titles

 Estonian SSR Champion

Honors

 Soviet Union Championship Runner-up

Roster

1950/51

Titles

 Estonian SSR Champion

Honors

 Soviet Union Championship Final Tournament (3rd place)

Roster

2007/08

Titles

 Estonian League Champion

Honors

 FIBA EuroCup Final Four (4th place)
 Estonian Basketball Cup Finalist

Roster

2008/09

Honors

Baltic Basketball League Final Four (3rd place)
 Estonian League Championship Runner-up

Roster

Tartu Ülikool/Rock